Maulana Muhammad Yusuf ibn Suleman ibn Qasim Motala (25 November 1946 – 8 September 2019) was a British Indian Sunni Muslim scholar, founder of Darul Uloom Bury and one of the disciples of Maulana Muhammad Zakariya Kandhlawi.

Early life and education
Maulana Yusuf Motala was born in Nani Naroli in Gujarat, British India, on 25 November 1946. He graduated from Mazahir Uloom, Saharanpur, where he studied under Maulana Muhammad Zakariyya Kandhlawi and Sheikh Muhammad Yunus Jaunpuri.

Career
Upon the instruction of Maulana Muhammad Zakariya Kandhlawi, Maulana Yusuf Motala established Darul Uloom Al-Arabiyyah Al-Islamiyyah in Holcombe, Bury, Lancashire, in 1973. He subsequently established several other educational institutes. He was included in the 2019 list of "The 500 Most Influential Muslims," published annually by the Royal Islamic Strategic Studies Centre.

Death
He died in Toronto, Canada on 8 September 2019 following a heart attack.

Literary works
Motala's works are:
Aḍwā' al-Bayān fī Tarjamatul Qurʼān (Urdu translation of the Quran).
 ' Aimma Araba aur Sufia Kiram (Urdu)''
 Juz' ʿAmma Tafsīr in Arabic (with Urdu and English Tarjumma)
 Arabic Khutbahs
 Hadyah-e-Haramain (Salaatus-Salaam Compilations - Arabic-Urdu)
 Buzurgon ke Wisal Ke Ahwaal (Urdu)
 Fitno se Hifazat ke liye Masnoon Duaaei (Urdu)
 Shaykh al-Ḥadīth, Ḥaḍrat Mawlānā Muḥammad Zakariyya saheb raḥmatullahe alayhe Aur Unke Khulafa Ikraam- Part 2 and Part 3 (Urdu)
 Inayat Naame (Urdu)
 Itaat-e-Rasool ﷺ (Urdu)
 Jamale Mohammadi ﷺ Jable Noor Pur (Urdu)
 Jamale Mohammadi ﷺ darse Bukhari ke Aaine mei  - Vol 1 & 2 Combined (Urdu)
 Jamale Muhammadi ﷺ ki Jalwa Gahen - Vols 1 and 2 (Urdu)
 Jāmiʿ al-Siyar (Urdu)
 Karamat Wa Kamalat-e-Awliya  - Volumes 1 and 2 (Urdu)
 Majmua e Darood o Salaam (Urdu)
 Mashaa'ikh Ahmadabad Volumes 1 and 2 (Urdu)
 Mere Bhai Jaan (Urdu)
 Muhabbat Naamay Volumes 1 and 2 (Urdu)
 Sham-o-Hind ke Awliya' ʿIzam (Urdu)
English translations of Shaykh Yusuf Motala's works are:
 Final Moments of the Pious (English Translation)
 Ḥaḍrat Shaykh and I (English)
 Miṣbāḥ al-Ẓalām fi al-Ṣalāt wa al-Salām ʿalā khayr al-Anām, compiled by Imām Nūr al-Dīn Al-Shūni (RA), emphasised by Ḥaḍrat Mawlānā Yūsuf Motālā ṣaheb (Englis /Arabic)
 99 Names of Allah (Asmaaul-Husnaa) and 99 Attributes/Appellations of Prophet Muhammad ﷺ
 The Need for Simple Weddings (English)

References

1946 births
2019 deaths
20th-century Muslim scholars of Islam
British Muslims
Indian Muslims
Indian emigrants to England
Mazahir Uloom alumni
Islamic scholars in the United Kingdom